Siaosi "CC" Mahoni (born 29 January 1997) is an American international rugby union player for the Houston Sabercats in Major League Rugby (MLR). His preferred position is lock. He is of Tongan descent.

Mahoni was part of the first professional rugby competition in the United States, playing for PRO Rugby team San Francisco Rush.

He has played pro rugby in France for RC Narbonne and also in California for the San Diego Legion prior to his arrival in Texas for the Houston Sabercats.

References

External links
USA Eagles profile

1997 births
American rugby union players
American people of Tongan descent
United States international rugby union players
San Diego Legion players
San Francisco Rush players
Living people
Rugby union locks
RC Narbonne players
Houston SaberCats players